Portland (or the Portland) is a sternwheel steamboat built in 1947 for the Port of Portland, Oregon, in the United States.

The Portland is listed on the National Register of Historic Places, and presently hosts the Oregon Maritime Museum which owns the vessel.  The vessel is moored at the Willamette River seawall next to Tom McCall Waterfront Park in downtown Portland.

History
Portland was built in 1947 and delivered to the Port of Portland on August 29 of that year. She was operated as a tug by both Willamette Tug & Barge and Shaver Transportation until she was retired in 1981. By that time, the Port of Portland was serving oil supertankers from Alaska that were too large for Portland to assist, and container ships with bow thrusting capabilities that reduced the need for tug assistance.

Built at a time when steam paddlewheels were giving way to more modern propulsion systems, Portland was originally proposed as a diesel-powered screw-driven vessel, but at the request of the Columbia River Pilots Association she was built with more traditional propulsion.  As a result, she was the last steam-powered, sternwheel tugboat built in the United States. She was also the last such vessel still in service in the U.S. at the time of her retirement in 1981.  For these reasons, she is listed on the National Register of Historic Places as "an outstanding representative of her type and method of construction."

Portland was built to replace her predecessor of the same name, built in 1919. Unlike her predecessor, the present Portland is built with a steel hull, and a wooden superstructure.

Oregon Maritime Museum

In 1991, nearly ten years after Portland was retired, ownership was transferred to the Oregon Maritime Museum for $1, where restoration work began with the intent of turning her into a stationary museum ship. Interest and fundraising for the project exceeded expectations, and $700,000 in donations allowed Portland to be restored to a functioning, seaworthy condition.  Restoration work was completed in 1993, with occasional passenger trips until the Coast Guard inspected the vessel in 2001 and shut passenger operations down until the ship could pass inspection.  The museum raised an addition $480,000 in funds, volunteers put an additional million dollars in labor over seven years, and the ship was cleared for passenger service in 2008.

In 1994, Portland was moved to her present location, at Tom McCall Waterfront Park in downtown Portland, where she is available most days for tours. In 2002, the static displays for the Oregon Maritime Museumcalled the Oregon Maritime Center and Museum until 2004were brought on board and are now a part of the tour.

Notable events

1952 Steamboat Race 
On January 24, 1952, the Portland raced against the older sternwheel tug Henderson in a staged race on the Columbia River in order to promote the upcoming Jimmy Stewart film Bend of the River (with the stars riding on Henderson). Henderson won by a length and a half.

1952 freeing S.G. Follis
The heavy-laden , inbound to Portland, ran firm aground at the Sauvie Island dike. Other tugs tried to free her to no avail.  With lines fast to S.G. Follis, the wash from Portlands paddle wheel in full reverse began to loosen the sand under S.G. Follis, allowing Portland to work her free.

1957 Portland saves the Hawthorne Bridge
On April 14, 1957, two ships set to be scrapped broke from their moorings and collided with the Hawthorne Bridge. Two of the most powerful diesel tugs available were unable to do much more than relieve some of the strain from the bridge. Portland was able to free the ships and tow them to moorings before the strain broke the bridge. The Columbia River Pilots Association saw this incident as justification for having insisted that Portland be a steam-powered sternwheeler.

2008 grounding
In 2008, Portland was set to participate in the first steamboat race on the Columbia River in more than half a century, recreating the 1952 race.  She was set to race against the sternwheeler , as a part of the Sternwheeler Days Festival in Cascade Locks, Oregon. Portlands steering locked, and she ran into the bank, damaging her wheel.  Without power or steering, she drifted towards the Bonneville Dam until another tug secured a line and towed her to safety. A Coast Guard investigation cited a problem with an improperly repaired gear in the steering system dating back to 1997. Portland and Columbia Gorge have since raced at least three times, with the Portland winning two of the races.

2012 collision
As the Portland was docking for the Heritage Maritime Festival in St. Helens, she backed into the Portland Pirate Festival's tall ship . While no one was injured, significant damage was done to Royaliste. As of July 2012, an investigation was ongoing.

Pop culture references
 Portland played the role of the gambling vessel Lauren Belle for the 1994 movie Maverick.
 Portlands stern appears at the end of the opening credits for the TV series Portlandia, Seasons 1 and 2.

See also
 
 Tourist sternwheelers of Oregon

References

External links

National Register of Historic Places in Portland, Oregon
Paddle steamers of Oregon
Ships on the National Register of Historic Places in Oregon
Steamboats of the Willamette River
Steamboats of the Columbia River
1947 ships
Southwest Portland, Oregon
Old Town Chinatown
Museums in Portland, Oregon
Museum ships in Oregon
Tom McCall Waterfront Park
Tugboats of the United States